Ireland Music Week, previously known as Hard Working Class Heroes (or HWCH), is an Irish music festival for emerging bands. It has taken place in Dublin on an annual basis in and around September of each year since 2003. The Irish Times has referred to the event as "an essential must-see/do on Ireland's music calendar".

Organised by First Music Contact and Wrong Tape Speed, Hard Working Class Heroes has taken place since 2003. On 25 April 2019, it was announced that Hard Working Class Heroes would re-brand as Ireland Music Week.

References

External links
 Official site
 2008 Hot Press photos

2000s in Irish music
2010s in Irish music
Music in Dublin (city)
Recurring events established in 2003
Rock festivals in Ireland
Tourist attractions in Dublin (city)
Indie rock festivals